The 2017 Categoría Primera B season (officially known as the 2017 Torneo Águila season for sponsorship reasons) was the 28th season since its founding as Colombia's second division football league.

Format
For this season, the league switched from the 'one tournament per year' format used in the two most recent seasons to a 'two tournaments per year' one. The season will consist of two tournaments: the 'Torneo Apertura' and the 'Torneo Finalización'. Both were divided into three stages. The First Stage was contested on a home-and-away basis, with each team playing the other teams once and playing a regional rival once more. The top eight teams after the sixteen rounds advanced to a knockout round, where they were pitted into four ties to be played on a home-and-away basis, with the four winners advancing to the semifinals and the winner of each semifinal advancing to the final of the tournament, which was played on a home-and-away basis as well. 

The winners of both finals qualified for the season final which was played after the conclusion of the Torneo Finalización and also consisted of two legs, with its winner being promoted to the Categoría Primera A for the 2018 season. The season runner-up would have to play the best team in the aggregate table (other than the champion) on a home-and-away basis for the second promotion berth. In case a team won both the Apertura and Finalización tournaments, it would be promoted and the second promoted team would have been the winner of the double-legged series between the next two best teams in the aggregate table, however, if the season runner-up ended up as the best team in the aggregate table, it would also be promoted and the promotion play-off would not be played.

Teams
16 teams took part, fourteen of them returning from last season plus Boyacá Chicó and Fortaleza, who were relegated from the 2016 Primera A. The former played in the second tier after 13 years while the latter returned after one season in the top flight. Both teams replaced América de Cali and Tigres who earned promotion at the end of the last season.

a: Cúcuta Deportivo used the Estadio Municipal Héctor El Zipa González in Zipaquirá as home stadium between February and August.
b: Unión Magdalena used the Estadio Diego de Carvajal in Magangué instead of the Estadio Municipal de Ciénaga as home stadium for the 2017 season.

Torneo Apertura

First stage

Standings

Results

Knockout phase bracket

Quarterfinals

|}

Semifinals

|}

Finals

Top goalscorers

Source: Resultados.com

Torneo Finalización

First stage

Standings

Results

Knockout phase bracket

Quarterfinals

|}

Semifinals

|}

Finals

Top goalscorers

Source: Resultados.com

Final

Aggregate table

Promotion play-off
Since the season runners-up Leones also ended up as the best team in the aggregate table, they earned automatic promotion to the Categoría Primera A and the promotion play-off was not played.

See also
 2017 Categoría Primera A season
 2017 Copa Colombia

References

External links 
  

Categoría Primera B seasons
1
Colombia